Khoa, khoya, khowa or mawa is a dairy food widely used in the cuisines of the Indian subcontinent, encompassing India, Nepal, Bangladesh and Pakistan. It is made of either dried whole milk or milk thickened by heating in an open iron pan. It is lower in moisture than typical fresh cheeses such as ricotta. It is made up of whole milk instead of whey.

Preparation

A concentration of milk to one-fifth volume is normal in the production of khoa. Khoa is used as the base for a wide variety of Indian sweets. About 600,000 metric tons are produced annually in India. Khoa is made from both cow and water buffalo milk. Khoa is made by simmering full-fat milk in a large, shallow iron pan for several hours over a medium fire. The gradual evaporation of its water content leaves only the milk solids. Another quick way of making khoa is to add full fat milk powder to skimmed milk and mixing and heating until it becomes thick. This may, however, not have the same characteristics as traditionally made khoa.

Khoa is normally white or pale yellow. If prepared in the winter, it may be saved for use in the summer, and may acquire a green tinge and grainier texture from a harmless surface mould. This is called hariyali (green khoa) and is used in recipes where the khoa is thoroughly cooked, e.g., gulab jamun. With the advent of refrigeration, the production of hariyali is rare.

Types 

Khoa is classified into different types, based on moisture content. Different types of khoa are used for different preparations.

 Batti, meaning "rock", has 20% moisture by weight and is the hardest of the three types; it can be grated like cheese. It can be aged for up to a year, during which it develops a unique aroma and a mouldy outer surface.
 Chikna ("slippery" or "squishy") khoa has 50% moisture.
 Daanedaar is a grainy variety. The milk is coagulated with an acid during the simmering; it has a moderate moisture content. It is used for preparing kalakand, gourd barfi and other sweets.
 Pindi, dry khoa, is used for preparing barfi and peda.
 Dhap, a less dried version, is used for preparing gulab jamun and pantua.

Uses

Khoa is used in various types of sweets: 
Pedha is sweetened khoa formed into balls or thick disks (like patties) with flavourings such as saffron and/or cardamom added.
 Gulab jamun, also a round ball sweet made from khoa and then deep fried and soaked in rose water flavoured sugar or honey syrup. A very popular Indian sweet.
Barfi (or burfi) is also flavoured, but khoa is not the only ingredient. Typically, another ingredient, such as thickened fruit pulp or coconut shavings, is added to khoa and slow cooked until the moisture evaporates sufficiently to give the consistency of fudge, so it can be flattened and cut into rectangles, parallelograms or diamond shapes.
 Gujia, a sweet fried dumpling stuffed with khoa and nuts. A very popular sweet usually prepared in Holi.
 Halwa is essentially a fudge made by adding khoa to wheat starch or cornstarch and sugar syrup to give a dairy-like taste and texture and as a thickening agent. Most halva recipes, however may omit the khoa, relying only on starch and sugar plus slivered nuts, spices such as cardamom and/ or saffron, and flavorings such as rose water and screwpine.
 Main course north India dishes like khoya paneer, Makhmali Kofte, Khoya Matar.
Naan roti stuffed with khoa is a speciality of the Muslim bakers of Bangalore.
Cream Bell Ice Creams of India sells an ice cream brand called Royal Rajwadi that contains thick layers of cold pressed Mawa covered in a thin layer of Indian Kulfi ice cream.

See also

References

External links
 FAO document discussing many dairy products including khoa

Punjabi cuisine
Nepalese cuisine
Indian dairy products